This article is a list of episodes from the television show She-Ra: Princess of Power in production order.

Series overview

Episodes

Season 1 (1985)

Season 2 (1986–87)

References

External links
 
 She-Ra: Princess of Power at YouTube
She-Ra: Princess of Power at Hulu

Lists of American children's animated television series episodes
Lists of American science fiction television series episodes
List of She-Ra: Princess of Power episodes